Argidia subvelata is a moth of the family Noctuidae first described by Francis Walker in 1865. It is found in Mexico, Costa Rica, Puerto Rico, Cuba and Brazil.

References

Moths described in 1865
Catocalinae